El Tren De Los Momentos Tour is a concert tour by Spanish singer Alejandro Sanz as promoting his album El Tren de los Momentos.

Tour set list 
 El Tren de los Momentos
 En la Planta de Tus Pies
 Quisiera Ser
 Enséñame Tus Manos
 A la Primera Persona
 La Peleita
 Cuando Nadie Me Ve
 Corazón Partío
 Donde Convergemos
 Regálame la Silla Donde Te Esperé
 Se lo Dices Tú
 Labana
 Y, ¿Si Fuera Ella? – Mi Soledad y Yo – La Fuerza del Corazón – Amiga Mía
 El Alma al Aire
 Try To Save Your Song
 Yo Sé lo Que la Gente Piensa
 ¿Lo Ves?
 Te lo Agradezco, Pero No
 No Es lo Mismo

Tour dates

Box office score data (Billboard)

Cancellations and rescheduled 
The Montevideo show (March 25, 2007) was cancelled and not rescheduled.
The Managua show (October 28, 2007) was rescheduled to November 1, 2007.
The Caracas show (February 14, 2008) was cancelled.

Band 
 Michael Cirincione – Musical Director and Guitar
 Alfonso Perez – Keyboards, Guitar and Backing vocal
 Luis Dulzaides – Percussion
 Carlos Martin – Trombon, Keyboards and Percussion
 Steve Rodriguez – Bass
 Selan Lemer – Keyboards and Backing vocal
 Nathaniel Townsley – Drums
 Christopher Hierro – Keyboards and backing vocal
 Meritxell Sust – Backing vocal
 Sara Devine – Backing vocal
 Javier Vercher – Trombone
 Luis Aquino – Trumpet

References

External links 
 Web oficial de Alejandro Sanz
 Info del tour por españa en Movistar

2007 concert tours
2008 concert tours
Alejandro Sanz